Anastasia Aleksandrovna Zolotareva ( born 18 January 2002) is a Russian tennis player.

Zolotareva has a career-high singles ranking by the WTA of 243, achieved on 30 January 2023. She also has a career-high WTA doubles ranking of world No. 371, set on 31 October 2022. She has won twelve singles and nine doubles titles on the ITF Women's World Tennis Tour.

Zolotareva won her biggest title to date at the 2022 President's Cup, where she partnered with Mariia Tkacheva to win the doubles title.

ITF Circuit finals

Singles: 13 (12 titles, 1 runner-up)

Doubles: 16 (9 titles, 7 runner-ups)

References

External links
 
 

2002 births
Living people
Russian female tennis players
21st-century Russian women